Mechanicstown may refer to:

Mechanicstown, New York
Mechanicstown, Ohio
Mechanicstown, West Virginia
Mechanicstown Elementary School